The 1982 Tasmanian state election was held on 15 May 1982 in the Australian state of Tasmania to elect 35 members of the Tasmanian House of Assembly. The election used the Hare-Clark proportional representation system — seven members were elected from each of five electorates. The quota required for election was 12.5% in each division.

The incumbent Labor Party, in power since 1972 and led by Premier Harry Holgate, was defeated by the opposition Liberal Party, led by Robin Gray.

The proposed Franklin Dam was a major issue around the time of the election.

The Australian Democrats contested all electorates. Independent Green candidates contested the electorate of Denison only.

Results

The Liberal Party won a comfortable majority.  Not only was this only the second time in 48 years that Labor had been out of office in Tasmania, but it was the first time in 51 years that the main non-Labor party in Tasmania had won an outright majority at an election. The Democrats' Norm Sanders retained his seat, which had originally been won at the Denison state by-election in 1980. Former Labor premier Doug Lowe also retained his seat as an independent.

|}

 The Independent Labor label refers to the separate campaigns by former Premier Doug Lowe and Labor MHA Mary Willey.
 The Green vote referred to here is Bob Brown's campaign in the seat of Denison, where he attained 8.6% of the vote.

Distribution of votes

Primary vote by division

Distribution of seats

Aftermath
Democrat Norm Sanders resigned in late 1982 and independent Green Bob Brown was elected as his replacement after a recount of votes.

See also
Members of the Tasmanian House of Assembly, 1982–1986
Candidates of the 1982 Tasmanian state election

References

Elections in Tasmania
1982 elections in Australia
1980s in Tasmania
May 1982 events in Australia